Stephen Lucey (born 4 January 1980 in Croom, County Limerick) is a former Irish sportsperson.  He plays hurling with his local club Croom and was with the Limerick senior inter-county team. He also played football with Limerick.

Playing career

Club

Lucey plays hurling with his local Croom club and has enjoyed some success. He also played with UCD during his college days.

Inter-county

Lucey first came to prominence on the inter-county scene as a member of the Limerick under-21 team.  He won a Munster title at this level in 2000 before later collecting an All-Ireland medal following a victory over Galway.  The following year Lucey won a second set of Munster and All-Ireland under-21 honours, as LImerick completed the second leg of a three-in-a-row.  By this stage he had already joined the county senior team, however, Limerick's hurling fortunes were about to take a dramatic downturn.  Following the county's victory over Cork in the Munster Championship in 2001 Limerick failed to win a game in the province until their 2007 Munster semi-final victory over Tipperary.  This was achieved following a three-game saga, however, Lucey's side later lost the Munster final to Waterford.  Limerick later gained revenge by defeating 'the Decies' in the subsequent All-Ireland semi-final, setting up an All-Ireland final meeting with Kilkenny on 2 September 2007. In 2009 Lucey, along with 11 others, was dropped from the hurling squad thus ending his 9 year career.
In early 2011 Lucey was recalled to the hurling panel after new Dónal O'Grady was appointed as manager.

Football

Lucey won a Munster Under-21 Football Championship in 2000  and played in the All Ireland final only to lose out to Tyrone in the final. He won 2 Munster Under-21 Hurling Championship in 2000 and 2001. He played in two Munster Senior Football Championship final only to lose out to Kerry both times. He made a return to the football panel in 2009 and played in another Munster Senior Football Championship final but lost out to Cork by a point. The following year Lucey's bad luck went on as Limerick were once again beaten this time by Kerry in the Munster Final.

Honours
Hurling
 2 All-Ireland Under-21 Hurling Championship 2000 2001
 2 Munster Under-21 Hurling Championship 2000 2001
 1 National Hurling League Division 2 2011
 1 Dublin Under-21 Hurling Championship 2001
Football
 1 Munster Under-21 Football Championship 2000
 1 National Football League Division 4 2010
 1 McGrath Cup 2004
 1 Dublin Senior Football Championship 2002
Awards
 1 GPA Hurling Team of the Year 2007
 1 Munster Hurling Team of the Year 2005
 1 Munster Football Team of the Year 2004

References

Teams

1980 births
Living people
Croom hurlers
Limerick inter-county hurlers
Croom Gaelic footballers
Limerick inter-county Gaelic footballers
UCD hurlers